Events from the year 1662 in China.

Incumbents 
 Kangxi Emperor (1st year)
 Regents — Sonin, Ebilun, Suksaha, and Oboi

Viceroys
 Viceroy of Zhili — Miao Cheng
 Viceroy of Min-Zhe — Zhao Tingchen
 Viceroy of Huguang — Zhang Changgeng
 Viceroy of Shaanxi — Bai Rumei
 Viceroy of Guangdong — Li Qifeng
 Viceroy of Yun-Gui — Zhao Tingchen 
 Viceroy of Guizhou — Tong Yannian, Yang Maoxun
 Viceroy of Yunnan — Bian Sanyuan
 Viceroy of Sichuan — Li Guoying
 Viceroy of Jiangnan —  Lang Tingzuo

Events 
 February 1 — Siege of Fort Zeelandia concludes with Dutch forces in Taiwan surrendering to Zheng Chenggong (Koxinga)
 February 18 — The Kangxi era begins with the start of the following Lunar Year
 Spring — the regents ordered a Great Clearance in southern China that evacuated the entire population from the seacoast to counter a resistance movement started by Ming loyalists under the leadership of Taiwan-based Ming general Koxinga, also known as Zheng Chenggong
 June 1 — Zhu Youlang, the Yongli Emperor of Southern Ming, is captured in killed by forces led by Wu Sangui, while in Toungoo dynasty-ruled Burma. The last of the Ming dynasty pretenders have been defeated.
 June 23 — Koxinga dies in Anping, Taiwan of Malaria, his son Zheng Jing takes over the Zheng regime, later leading the remaining 7,000 Ming loyalist troops to Taiwan
 An imperial edict banning footbinding is put in place. This is the first one imposed on all of China
 For his efforts defeating Ming loyalist forces, Wu Sangui is rewarded with the title of Pingxi Wang (平西王; translated as "Prince Who Pacifies the West" or "King Who Pacifies the West") with a fief in Yunnan by the Qing imperial court, Guizhou is added to his domain later that year
 Kaifeng repopulated after most residents are killed in the devastating 1642 man-made flood designed to lift the siege from Li Zicheng’s rebel forces
 Sino-Russian border conflicts

Births 
 Shanxi — Cao Ji Wu (曹繼武, 1662-1722), a master of the internal martial art of Xinyi (Heart and Intention Boxing), precursor of Xingyi (Form and Intention Boxing)
 Xiamen — Zheng Kezang (鄭克𡒉 1662-1681), the crown prince and regency of Kingdom of Tungning. Kezhang was the eldest son of Zheng Jing and Chen Zhao-niang, and his grandparents were Koxinga and Princess Dong
 Tian Wenjing (田文鏡; 1662 – 1732), styled Yiguang (抑光), a prominent mandarin who lived during the reign of the Kangxi and Yongzheng Emperors of the Qing Dynasty

Deaths 
 June 23 — Koxinga (國姓爺), Zheng Chenggong (鄭成功), Prince of Yanping (1624 – 1662), was a Chinese Ming loyalist who resisted the Qing conquest of China in the 17th century, fighting them on China's southeastern coast
 Ji Jike (姬際可, 1588–1662) — a highly accomplished martial artist from Yongji, Shanxi Province. Also known as Ji Longfeng (Chinese: 姬龍峰), he is widely considered to be the originator of the internal martial art of Xingyiquan
 Empress Xiaogangkuang (died 1662) — a Chinese Empress consort of the Southern Ming Dynasty, empress to the Yongli Emperor
 Li Dingguo (李定國, 1621 – 1662) — a military general who fought for the Southern Ming against the Qing Dynasty
 Zhu Yihai (朱以海, 1618–1662) — ruled as the Gengyin Emperor (庚寅) of the Southern Ming Dynasty from reigning from 1645 to 1655

References

 

 
China